The men's ISSF 25 meter rapid fire pistol was a shooting sports event held as part of the Shooting at the 1932 Summer Olympics programme. It was the sixth appearance of the event. The competition was held on August 12, 1932. 18 shooters from 7 nations competed. Nations were limited to three shooters each. The event was won by Renzo Morigi of Italy, with Heinrich Hax of Germany taking silver and another Italian, Domenico Matteucci, earning bronze. They were the first medals in the event for both nations.

Background
This was the sixth appearance of what would become standardised as the men's ISSF 25 meter rapid fire pistol event, the only event on the 2020 programme that traces back to 1896. The event has been held at every Summer Olympics except 1904 and 1928 (when no shooting events were held) and 1908; it was nominally open to women from 1968 to 1980, although very few women participated these years. The first five events were quite different, with some level of consistency finally beginning with the 1932 event—which, though it had differences from the 1924 competition, was roughly similar.

Spain made its debut in the event. The United States made its fourth appearance in the event, most of any nation.

Competition format
As in 1924, the first round consisted of 18 shots in 3 series of 6 shots each. For each series, there were six separate standing silhouette targets that appeared for 8 seconds (down from 10 in 1924); the score for the string was how many targets were hit (there were no scoring rings). Maximum score was thus 18, 1 per shot.

The next four rounds were similar to the 1924 tie-breakers, with each round consisting of a single series of 6 shots. However, unlike in 1924 when the time limit was static at 8 seconds per series for the tie-breakers, the time kept shortening: 6 seconds for the second round, 4 for the third, 3 for the fourth, and 2 for the fifth. Shooters needed to achieve a perfect score in each round to advance to the next.

Ties within a round were not broken.

Schedule

Results
After the first round all competitors were eliminated which were not able to hit all 18 targets; six men were thus eliminated. Only one competitor was eliminated after the second round, because he was not able to achieve all six hits. Five marksmen were eliminated after round three and three were eliminated after the fourth round.

Renzo Morigi won the contest without missing any target.

References

External links
 Official Report
 

Shooting at the 1932 Summer Olympics
Men's 1932